Verticordia pritzelii, commonly known as Pritzel's featherflower, is a flowering plant in the myrtle family, Myrtaceae and is endemic to the south-west of Western Australia. It is a compact, woody shrub with several main stems, small, linear to club-shaped leaves, and rounded groups of deep pink flowers from late spring to mid-summer.

Description

The sepals are spreading, deep pink but fade to white as they age. Flowering time is from October to early January.

The deep colouration of the flowers of V. pritzelii and its compact habit distinguish it from other members of section Catocalypta.

Taxonomy and naming
Verticordia pritzleii was first formally described by Ludwig Diels in 1904 from a specimen collected near Coolgardie. The description was published in Fragmenta Phytographiae Australiae occidentalis. The specific epithet (pritzelii) honours Ernst Georg Pritzel who visited Diels in 1900.

When Alex George reviewed the genus Verticordia in 1991, he placed this species in subgenus Verticordia, section Catocalypta along with V. inclusa, V. apecta, V. insignis, V. habrantha, V. lehmannii and V. roei.

Distribution and habitat
Pritzel's featherflower is found in yellow or white to grey sand, on undulating plains between Perenjori, Bungalbin and Forrestania in the Avon Wheatbelt, Coolgardie, Mallee, Murchison and Swan Coastal Plain biogeographic regions.

Conservation
Verticordia pritzelii is classified as "not threatened" by the Western Australian Government Department of Parks and Wildlife.

Use in horticulture
This species shows potential as a garden plant and is relatively easy to propagate, however, it has proven difficult to maintain in the garden although previously grown successfully in Kings Park Botanical Garden.

References

pritzelii
Rosids of Western Australia
Eudicots of Western Australia
Plants described in 1904